Spathulina sicula is a species of tephritid or fruit flies in the genus Spathulina of the family Tephritidae.

Distribution
Spain, Portugal, Italy, Israel, Canary Islands.

References

Tephritinae
Insects described in 1856
Diptera of Europe
Diptera of Asia
Taxa named by Camillo Rondani